The Ecclesiastical Jurisdiction Act 1677 (29 Car 2 c 9) was an act of the Parliament of England. It abolished the death penalty for heresy, blasphemy, atheism, schism, and such crimes. The whole act was repealed by section 87 of, and schedule 5 to, the Ecclesiastical Jurisdiction Measure 1963 (No 1).

See also
 Blasphemy law in the United Kingdom
 Capital punishment in the United Kingdom

Notes

1677 in England
1677 in law
Acts of the Parliament of England
Death penalty law
English criminal law